Castlight Health is a San Franciscobased healthcare navigation company. It offers comparison tools showing price and quality metrics for tests and procedures offered by healthcare providers.

The Castlight platform is licensed through a business-to-business-based model. Employees of companies that have purchased subscriptions have access to the Castlight platform. Health plan partners, such as Anthem Blue Cross Blue Shield, provide commercial members with access to Castlight's tools as well. In 2012 the company secured $100 million in investment funds. In 2014 the company had its initial public offering, valued at $2 billion. Since then, the company claims to have grown to work with "over 260 customers covering 10 million lives" on the platform.

References

External links
 

Health care companies based in California
Companies based in San Francisco
Companies listed on the New York Stock Exchange